Uchila or Uchil may refer to the following places in Karnataka, India:

 Uchila, Dakshina Kannada district
 Uchila, Udupi district